Heywood is a civil parish in the English county of Norfolk. It was formed in 2003 from a part of the parish of Diss.
For the purposes of local government, it falls within the district of South Norfolk.

Notes 

Civil parishes in Norfolk
South Norfolk